The 1928–29 Rugby Football League season was the 34th season of rugby league football.

Season summary

Huddersfield won their fourth Championship when they beat Leeds 2-0 in the play-off final.

On 4 May 1929 the first Challenge Cup Final to be held at Wembley Stadium was played. 41,500 saw Wigan beat Dewsbury 13-2.

Carlisle City fielded a team, but resigned after 10 matches and their record was expunged from the table. They won 1 and lost 9, scoring 59 and conceding 166. 

Swinton moved from their Chorley Road ground this season due to a dispute over rent. They built a new stadium at Station Road, Swinton using the stands from the old ground.

Swinton won the Lancashire League, and Huddersfield won the Yorkshire League. Wigan beat Widnes 5–4 to win the Lancashire Cup, and Leeds beat Featherstone Rovers 5–0 to win the Yorkshire County Cup.

Championship

Championship play-off

Challenge Cup

Wigan beat Dewsbury 13–2 in the first final to be played at Wembley Stadium in front of a crowd of 41,000.

This was Wigan’s second Challenge Cup Final win in their fourth Cup Final appearance.

References

Sources
1928-29 Rugby Football League season at wigan.rlfans.com
The Challenge Cup at The Rugby Football League website

1928 in English rugby league
1929 in English rugby league
Northern Rugby Football League seasons